Rudeanu is a Romanian surname. Notable people with the surname include:

Alexei Rudeanu (1939–2013), Romanian author
Ion Rudeanu, Romanian fencer

Romanian-language surnames